Silence! The Musical is a 2005 musical created by Jon and Al Kaplan as a parody of the 1991 Academy Award-winning film The Silence of the Lambs.

Characters
 Clarice Starling (alto) – A student at the FBI Academy. She hopes to work at the Behavioral Science Unit, tracking down serial killers and ultimately apprehending them. Her mentor, Jack Crawford, sends her to interview Dr. Hannibal Lecter. The character is commonly portrayed as having a lisp.
 Dr. Hannibal Lecter (bari-tenor) – A brilliant psychiatrist and cannibalistic serial killer who helps Clarice out in her investigation and eventually escapes prison in a bloody massacre.
 Jame Gumb/Buffalo Bill (baritone) – Serial killer and main antagonist of the plot. He murders overweight women so he can remove their skin and fashion a "woman suit" for himself; he believes himself to be transsexual but is too disturbed to qualify for sex reassignment surgery.
 Catherine Baker Martin (soprano) – Daughter of Senator Ruth Martin, kidnapped and imprisoned by "Buffalo Bill".
 Jack Crawford (bass-baritone) – The Agent-in-Charge of the Behavioral Science Unit of the FBI in Quantico, Virginia.
 Ardelia Mapp (mezzo-soprano) – Roommate of Clarice Starling and also a student at the FBI Academy who helps her out in the investigation.
 Dr. Frederick Chilton (high baritone) – The pompous, incompetent director of the Chesapeake State Hospital for the Criminally Insane and later Baltimore Hospital for the Criminally Insane. There, he is the jailer of Hannibal Lecter.
 Papa Starling (baritone) – Clarice's deceased father who appears to her in visions to encourage her in carrying out the investigation. A Virginia sheriff who was killed during a robbery.
 Senator Ruth Martin (soprano) – National senator and mother of Catherine, who pleads for Buffalo Bill to release her daughter on national television and arranges for Lecter to be transferred to a lighter security prison in Baltimore in exchange for information on the killer.

Musical numbers
 "Silence!" – The Lambs
 "Thish Ish It" – Clarice
 "The Right Guide" – Chilton and FBI Agents
 "If I Could Smell Her Cunt" – Lecter
 "Papa Shtarling" – Papa Starling and Clarice
 "It's Agent Shtarling" – Clarice and FBI Agents
 "Are You About a Size 14?" – Bill, Catherine and Ensemble
 "My Daughter Is Catherine" – Senator Martin
 "Quid Pro Quo" – Lecter and Clarice
 "I'd Fuck Me" – Bill and Ensemble
 "It's Me!" – Lecter and Ensemble
 "Catherine Dies Today" – Ardelia, Clarice, Bill and Ensemble
 "Papa Shtarling" (reprise) – Papa Starling and Clarice
 "Put the Fucking Lotion in the Basket" – Bill and Catherine
 "We're Goin' In!" – Crawford, FBI Agents, Clarice and Bill
 "In the Dark with a Maniac" – Clarice, Bill, Catherine and Ensemble
 "I'd Fuck Me" (reprise) – Bill
 "Silence!" (reprise) – The Lambs

Development
The project began in 2003 as an internet musical made up of nine songs that retold the entire story. The audio tracks became popular to the extent that a live show was conceived and staged. Six additional songs were written by the Kaplans, and the book was written by Hunter Bell, based on the original screenplay Silence! The Musical, also by the Kaplans.

Productions
The stage musical premiered in the Lucille Lortel Theatre, New York, on August 12, 2005 as part of the New York International Fringe Festival, and showed until August 28, 2005. The production was directed by Christopher Gattelli.

Silence! had its European premiere in London on October 19, 2009, showing for two weeks at the Barons Court Theatre. The run was directed by David Phipps-Davis. Christopher Gattelli's production subsequently transferred to the Above The Stag Theatre, running from January 19 - February 28, 2010. Directed and choreographed by Gattelli, this production featured new material written for its London outing.

An off-Broadway mounting of the show opened June 24 – September 26, 2011 at Theatre 80, directed and choreographed by Christopher Gattelli. It transferred to the 9th Space Theatre at PS 122 on October 24, 2011.

The musical reopened on January 18, 2013 at the Elektra Theatre, in New York City's Times Square, through August 13.

Jobsite Theater in Tampa, FL, presented the southeastern US premiere of the show in the Jaeb Theater at the Straz Center for the Performing Arts Oct 14 – November 15, 2015.

Corn Productions presented the Chicago premiere at the Cornservatory July 8 – August 13, 2016.

Cloud 9 Theatricals, in association with Lang Entertainment Group and Ray of Light Theater presented the San Francisco premiere at the Victoria Theater January 26 – April 1, 2017.

Down Stage Right Theatre Productions, in association with the Neanderthal Arts Festival, presented the Western Canada premiere on July 25 - August 3, 2019.

Casts
The original New York cast featured:
 Brent Barrett as Hannibal Lecter
 Jenn Harris as Clarice Starling
 Stephen Bienskie as Jame Gumb / Buffalo Bill
 Deidre Goodwin as Ardelia Mapp
 Jeff Hiller
 Howard Kaye as Papa Starling
 Lucia Spina as Senator Martin / Catherine Martin
 Callan Bergmann as Jack Crawford
 Harry Bouvy as Dr. Frederick Chilton
 Ashlee Dupré

Silence! played 67 performances at the Hayworth Theatre in Los Angeles in late 2012. Christine Lakin and Davis Gaines headlined the cast.

Awards
 2005: Outstanding Musical, New York International Fringe Festival
 2011: Time Magazine's Top 10 Plays and Musicals 2011
 2012: Off Broadway Alliance Award for Best New Musical
 2012: Los Angeles Drama Critics Circle Award - Musical Score, Lead Performance, Choreography

Cast recording
A soundtrack album featuring the original nine tracks was made available "For fun only. Not for sale."

References

External links
 Jon and Al, writers of Silence! The Musical
 Silence! The Musical Official Website
 London Fringe (2009)

2003 musicals
Cannibalism in fiction
Musicals based on films
Musicals based on novels
Off-Broadway musicals
Parodies of horror
Hannibal Lecter (franchise)